Yurt is a portable dwelling structure.

Yurt may also refer to:

People
 Svend Yort (died 1981), noted collector of the postage stamps and postal history of Scandinavia

Places
 Mishar Yurt, a semi-autonomous principality of the Golden Horde
 Qırım Yurtu, Crimean Khanate
 Eger-Yurt, a village in the Kalbajar Rayon of Azerbaijan
 Eski Yurt, a historical settlement in South West Crimea
 Kuchek Yurt Sheykhan, a village in Fajr Rural District, in the Central District of Gonbad-e Qabus County, Golestan Province, Iran
 Nozhay-Yurt, a rural locality (a selo) and the administrative center of Nozhay-Yurtovsky District of the Chechen Republic, Russia 
 Yurt-e Kazem, a village in Golestan Province, Iran
 Yurt-e Zeynal, a village in Golestan Province, Iran

Other uses
 
 Yurt, Turkic equivalent of Horde or Ulus
 Yurt (river), a river in Crimea
 Yurt, a series of novels by C. Dale Brittain